Following is a list of justices of the North Carolina Supreme Court.

Current justices

Former justices

References

External links
North Carolina Supreme Court Historical Society page on Justices of the North Carolina Supreme Court

North Carolina
Justices